The Ambassador of the United Kingdom to Uruguay is head of the UK's diplomatic mission to Uruguay.  The official title is His Britannic Majesty's Ambassador to the Oriental Republic of Uruguay.

History
Geoffrey Jackson, the British ambassador to Uruguay, was kidnapped in January 1971. He spent eight months in captivity before being released for a ransom in September 1971.

List of heads of mission

Early diplomats
1824–1839: Thomas Samuel Hood
1846–1847: Adolphus Turner Chargé d'Affaires
1848: William Gore Ouseley Special Mission
1847–1851: Captain Robert Gore Chargé d'Affaires, buried at The British Cemetery, Montevideo
1851–1853: Hon. Frederick Bruce Chargé d'Affaires
1853–1854: George John Robert Gordon Chargé d'Affaires and Consul-General
Unknown: Theodore Lemm, buried at The British Cemetery, Montevideo
1871: Major James St. John Munro consul, buried at The British Cemetery, Montevideo
1879: Sir Clare Ford Minister Plenipotentiary and Consul-General

Minister Resident and Consul-General
1879–1884: Hon. Edmund Monson
1884–1888: William Palgrave
1888–1893: Ernest Satow
1893–1906: Walter Baring
1906–1912: Robert Kennedy

Envoy Extraordinary and Minister Plenipotentiary
1913–1919: Alfred Mitchell-Innes
1919–1925: Sir Claude Mallet
1925–1930: Ernest Scott
1930–1933: Robert Michell
1933–1941: Eugen Millington-Drake
1941–1943: Ralph Stevenson
1943: Gordon Vereker

Ambassador Extraordinary and Plenipotentiary
1944–1949: Sir Gordon Vereker
1949–1953: Sir Douglas Howard
1953–1955: Eric Lingeman
1955–1957: Sir Keith Jopson
1957–1961: Sir Malcolm Henderson
1961–1966: Norman Brain
1966–1969: Sir Keith Unwin
1969–1972: Geoffrey Jackson kidnapped 1971
1971–1972: James Hennessy (Consul) chargé d'affaires
1972–1977: Peter Oliver
1977–1980: William Peters
1980–1983: Patricia Hutchinson
1983–1986: Charles Wallace
1986–1989: Eric Vines
1989–1991: Colum John Sharkey
1991–1994: Donald Lamont
1995–1998: Robert Hendrie
1998–2001: Andrew Murray
2001–2005: John Everard
2005–2008: Hugh Salvesen
2008–2012: Patrick Mullee
2012–2016: Ben Lyster-Binns
2016–2020: Ian Duddy

2020–: Faye O'Connor

References

External links
British Embassy Montevideo

Uruguay
 
United Kingdom Ambassadors